Alberto Estella Goytre (23 September 1940 – 1 April 2022) was a Spanish politician. A member of the Union of the Democratic Centre and the People's Party, he served in the Congress of Deputies from 1977 to 1982. He died in Salamanca on 1 April 2022 at the age of 81.

References

1940 births
2022 deaths
People from Salamanca
University of Salamanca alumni
Union of the Democratic Centre (Spain) politicians
People's Party (Spain) politicians
Members of the Congress of Deputies (Spain)
Members of the constituent Congress of Deputies (Spain)
Members of the 1st Congress of Deputies (Spain)
20th-century Spanish politicians